In mathematics, a bullet-nose curve is a unicursal quartic curve with three inflection points, given by the equation

If 

then

are the two branches of the bullet curve at the origin.

References
 

Plane curves
Algebraic curves